José Güipe Jimenez (born 10 December 1988) is a Venezuelan rower. He competed in the 2020 Summer Olympics.

References

External links
 

1988 births
Living people
Rowers at the 2020 Summer Olympics
Venezuelan male rowers
Olympic rowers of Venezuela
Rowers at the 2015 Pan American Games
Pan American Games medalists in rowing
Pan American Games bronze medalists for Venezuela
Rowers at the 2011 Pan American Games
Medalists at the 2011 Pan American Games
21st-century Venezuelan people